The Nhuwala are an Aboriginal Australian people of the Pilbara region of Western Australia.

Language
Where Nhuwala fits into the classification of Australian Aboriginal languages has not yet been ascertained with absolute certainty due to lack of data, though the working assumption is that it belongs to the Ngayarta family.

Country
The hinterland reaches stopped short of the Thalanyji territory at the Ashburton River.

Alternative names
 Nuala
 Ngoala
 Noella
 Noanamaronga (Mardudunera exonym)
 Jawanmala (Yindjibarndi exonym, meaning "people downstream")
 Nunkaberi

Notes

Citations

Sources

Aboriginal peoples of Western Australia
Western Australia
History of Western Australia